Bayramhacı Dam is a dam and hydroelectric plant in Kayseri Province on Kızılırmak River, central Turkey.

Information 
Construction on the Bayramhac dam began in 2008, and it was finished on October 18, 2010. Its old village was submerged underneath the dam. It is located close to the attractions of Soğanlı Valley, and Tekgöz Bridge.

References

Further reading

External links
 Municipality's official website 
 Dam energy production official website. 
Dam energy information. 

Buildings and structures in Kayseri Province
Dams in Kayseri Province
Hydroelectric power stations in Turkey
Dams completed in 2005
Dams on the Kızılırmak River
2005 establishments in Turkey